Ernie Agat Gawilan  is a Filipino swimmer who competed at the 2016 and 2020 Summer Paralympics and was the first gold medalist for the Philippines in the Asian Para Games.

Early life
Gawilan was born in the Paquibato district of Davao City with underdeveloped extremities resulting to him lacking both legs and an underdeveloped left limb due to surviving an attempted abortion and poor pre-natal healthcare in the Marilog District of Davao City. He was orphaned at the young age after his father left him. His mother died of cholera when he was still five months old and his father left Ernie and his mother after the patriarch discovered his mother's infidelity. His grandfather took custody of him until when Ernie Gawilan met businessman Vicente Ferrazzini when he was nine years old. Ferrazzini convinced Gawilan's grandfather to send him to Davao City proper in a training center for the handicapped.

In the city, he reside at the Our Lady of Victory Training Center with other handicapped youth under the custody of the Maryknoll sisters of St. Dominic. Gawilan was taken care of by Cecilia Wood, a nun who served as director at the center from 1989 to 2010. Gawilan studied Holy Cross of Sasa for his high school studies and finished at least his second year studies. on May 5, 1991

Ernie Gawilan was brought to Samal Island in 2000 where he worked as a housekeeper of another training center operated by nuns. It was at this place that Gawilan took up swimming.

Career
Gawilan was scouted by swimming coach Mark Jude Corpuz when Corpuz saw him struggling to swim. Corpuz made Gawilan part of a persons with disability (PWD) swimming team he was handling and the Forest Hills resort pool became a place for Gawilan to train. Gawilan's first swimming competition was the 2008 Philippine Olympic Festival which was held in Cagayan de Oro, he was almost disqualified after competition officials learned that he forgot his swimming trunks but was allowed to compete wearing bulky cargo pants. Gawilan finished second in the competition which included members of PWD national team. The first placer, a native of Iligan and PWD national team member urged him to go to Manila and Gawilan became a member of the national team himself.

He has joined numerous tournaments in India, Indonesia, Italy, Japan, Malaysia, Myanmar, New Zealand, and Singapore and has won at least 15 international medals by November 2014. Initially competed under the S8 classification, Gawilan later competed under the S7 classification after a change in regulations by the International Paralympic Committee.

He trains under National Para Swimming Team Coaches Tony Ong and Ral Rosario.

Asian Para Games

Ernie Gawilan has competed in the Asian Para Games. At the 2014 Asian Para Games in Incheon, South Korea, he won three bronze medals, the most among the Philippine delegation. In the 2018 edition hosted Jakarta, Indonesia, Gawilan won the Philippines' first ever gold medal in the history of the games in the men's 200 meter individual medley SM7. He also won a silver in the 50 meter freestyle S7 event in the same edition.

Summer Paralympics
At the 2015 ASEAN Para Games in Singapore, Gawilan satisfied the Olympic qualifying time of 4:48.29 after he won a gold medal at the men's 400-meter freestyle S8 event with the time of 4:48.49. The feat qualified him for the 2016 Summer Paralympics to be held in Rio de Janeiro. The result was also an ASEAN Para Games recording beating the former record result of 5:03.09, as well as Gawilan's previous personal best of 4:53.67. The performance was followed by another gold at the men's 200 individual medley event. Before winning a gold medal at the games, Gawilan clinched the silver medal at the men's 100m freestyle event.

At the 2016 Summer Paralympics, Gawilan competed at the 400-meter freestyle, 100-meter freestyle and 100-meter backstroke events.

Gawilan is set to return at the 2020 Summer Paralympics after he attained the minimum qualifying time for the 400m freestyle S6 event. Gawilan formalized his qualification to the Olympics when he took part in a review classification race in the 2021 World Para Swimming World Series in Berlin which was held on June 18, 2021.

References

1991 births
Living people
Filipino male swimmers
Sportspeople from Davao City
Swimmers at the 2016 Summer Paralympics
Paralympic swimmers of the Philippines
ASEAN ParaGames competitors
Swimmers at the 2020 Summer Paralympics
S7-classified Paralympic swimmers
S8-classified Paralympic swimmers
Medalists at the 2018 Asian Para Games
Medalists at the 2014 Asian Para Games